Joasaph II (Joasaph of Novy Torg) was Patriarch of Moscow and All Rus' from 1667 until his death five years and one day later in 1672.

Joasaph was archimandrite of the Rozhdestvenskii (Nativity) Monastery in Vladimir from 1654 to April 25, 1656, when he was named archimandrite of the Trinity-St. Sergius Lavra.  In 1666, he was a member of the court that tried Patriarch Nikon and deposed him, although it also approved his reforms that had led to the Old Believer Schism.  

On February 10, 1667, Joasaph was elected patriarch.  He died February 11, 1672, and is buried in the Dormition Cathedral in the Moscow Kremlin.

References

External links
 Joasaph's biography 

Metropolitans and Patriarchs of Moscow
Burials at Dormition Cathedral, Moscow
17th-century Russian clergy
1672 deaths
17th-century Eastern Orthodox bishops
Year of birth unknown
Archimandrites